Lost in Time may refer to:

Film, television, and video games
Lost in Time (video game), a 1993 video game
Bugs Bunny: Lost in Time, a 1999 video game
Lost in Time (2003 film), a Hong Kong film
Lost in Time (2019 film), a Kenyan film
Lost in Time (Doctor Who), a 2004 Doctor Who DVD set
"Lost in Time" (The Sarah Jane Adventures), a 2010 The Sarah Jane Adventures episode
"Lost in Time" (Lego Ninjago: Masters of Spinjitzu), a 2017 Lego Ninjago: Masters of Spinjitzu episode
"Dunces and Dragons", alternate title "Lost in Time", episode of SpongeBob SquarePants

Music
Lost in Time (Akino album), 2007
Lost in Time (Eric Benét album), 2010
Lost in Time, a 2012 album by Khuli Chana
Lost in Time – The Early Years of Nocturnal Rites, a 2005 compilation double album by Nocturnal Rites